STV Rugby is a Scottish regional television programme featuring highlights of Pro12 rugby matches involving Edinburgh Rugby and Glasgow Warriors. The programme, produced by the STV News department in Glasgow, was first broadcast in the 2009/10 season after a deal with the Celtic League Association, Scottish Rugby and STV was reached, following the closure of Setanta Sports in the UK.

Magners League rugby returned to STV for the 2010/11 season, under the new name of Sports Centre: Rugby. The STV Rugby brand returned for the 2011/12 season, after Sports Centre was axed. The 2012/2013 season was the last to be covered by STV Rugby.

Broadcasts
The hour-long highlights programme was broadcast on Sunday afternoons during the Celtic League season and was available online on the STV Player after transmission. In addition to match highlights on Sundays, STV broadcast live coverage of the 1872 Cup games between Edinburgh Rugby and Glasgow Warriors during the Christmas and New Year period.

STV Rugby'''s first series was presented by former Scotland captain Andy Nicol with ex-Scottish & British Lions centre Scott Hastings and a studio guest every week. Outside broadcast coverage and commentary of games involving Welsh and Irish teams was provided by BBC Wales and Setanta Sports Ireland.

The 2011/12 series, presented by Eilidh Barbour, was broadcast on Sunday nights after the late ITV News'' bulletin, featuring highlights from the weekend's Pro12 games.

Match commentator 
Rory Hamilton

References

External links

2009 Scottish television series debuts
2013 Scottish television series endings
2000s Scottish television series
2010s Scottish television series
Sports television in Scotland
STV News
2000s British sports television series
2010s British sports television series
Rugby union on television